72nd Anniversary Min Buri Stadium or Chalerm Phrakiat Min Buri Stadium is a multi-purpose stadium in Min Buri, Bangkok, Thailand. The stadium built for celebration of the 72nd Birthday Anniversary of King Bhumibol Adulyadej, hence the name of the venue. It is used mostly for football matches and was the home stadium of Thai Honda. The stadium holds 10,000 people and consists of two large single-tier stands on each side of the pitch. There is no accommodation at either end. Only one of the stands has a cover: a cantilever roof that resembles a giant spoiler from a Formula One car. This stand has red seats fitted to the area underneath the roof. The rest of the stadium is unseated.

References

External links
 Photo of roof

Football venues in Thailand
Multi-purpose stadiums in Thailand
Sports venues in Bangkok
Sports venues completed in 1999
1999 establishments in Thailand